Stirchley and Brookside is a civil parish in the district of Telford and Wrekin, Shropshire, England, and contains the settlements of Stirchley and Brookside.  In the parish are five listed buildings that are recorded in the National Heritage List for England.  Of these, one is listed at Grade I, the highest of the three grades, and the others are at Grade II, the lowest grade.  The most important listed building in the parish is a 12th-century church, and the other listed buildings are farmhouses and farm buildings.


Key

Buildings

Notes and references

Notes

Citations

Sources

Lists of buildings and structures in Shropshire